is a Japanese motorcycle racer. Within the All Japan Road Race Championship, he has competed in the GP125 class, where he was champion in 2007, and in the J-GP3 class.

Career statistics

Grand Prix motorcycle racing

By season

Races by year
(key)

References

External links

1983 births
Living people
Japanese motorcycle racers
125cc World Championship riders